Alexey Viktorovich Shved (Russian: Алексей Викторович Швед; born December 16, 1988) is a Russian professional basketball player for CSKA Moscow of the VTB United League.

After helping lead CSKA Moscow to the EuroLeague final in 2012, Shved spent three years in the NBA, before returning to Europe and earning an All-EuroLeague Second Team selection in 2018. As a member of the Russian national team, he won the bronze medal at the 2012 Summer Olympics, as well as a bronze medal at EuroBasket 2011.

Professional career

CSKA Moscow (2006–2012)
Shved began his professional career with CSKA Moscow in a Russian Super League game, against Ural Great Perm, on November 4, 2006. He made his EuroLeague debut in a game against Žalgiris, on January 17, 2007. In February 2007, he joined Khimki Moscow Region, on loan from CSKA Moscow. He then returned to CSKA Moscow before the start of the 2007–08 season. In December 2009, he moved to Dynamo Moscow, on loan from CSKA Moscow. He moved back to CSKA Moscow before the start of the 2010–11 season. The following season, he reached the EuroLeague Final with the Reds.

Minnesota Timberwolves (2012–2014)
On July 23, 2012, CSKA Moscow announced the departure of Shved in order to sign with the Minnesota Timberwolves of the NBA. Two days later, he signed a multi-year deal with the Timberwolves.

Philadelphia 76ers (2014) 
On August 23, 2014, a three-team trade was completed, involving the Timberwolves, the Cleveland Cavaliers, and the Philadelphia 76ers.  As part of the deal, Shved and teammate Luc Mbah a Moute were traded to the Sixers, along with a 2015 first round draft pick from Cleveland.  The Cavaliers received Kevin Love from Minnesota, whereas the Wolves received Andrew Wiggins and Anthony Bennett from Cleveland and Thaddeus Young from Philadelphia.

Houston Rockets (2014–2015) 
On December 19, 2014, Shved was acquired by the Houston Rockets in a three-team trade that also involved the 76ers and the Minnesota Timberwolves.

New York Knicks (2015) 
On February 19, 2015, Shved was traded, along with two second-round picks, to the New York Knicks in exchange for Pablo Prigioni.

Khimki (2015–2021)
On July 16, 2015, Shved returned to Russia, and signed a three-year contract with Khimki. The contract was worth $10.2 million net income over three years. On March 27, 2017, Shved was named the European-wide second tier level EuroCup's season MVP. He was the first player in EuroCup history to average at least 22 points, 5 assists, and 4 rebounds per game in the same season. Shved was awarded the VTB United League MVP award for the 2016–17 season.

In July 2017, Shved extended his contract with Khimki, through the 2019–20 season. In 2017–18 season, Khimki made it to the 2018 EuroLeague Playoffs quarterfinals, where they were eliminated by CSKA Moscow, with 3–1 series result. Over the season, Shved led the EuroLeague in scoring, with a career-high 21.8 points per game, which earned him the Alphonso Ford EuroLeague Top Scorer Trophy. In May 2018, he was named the All-EuroLeague Second Team for the 2017–18 season.

Return to CSKA Moscow (2021–present)
On August 12, 2021, Shved officially returned to CSKA Moscow of the VTB United League, and of the EuroLeague until it was suspended due to the 2022 Russian invasion of Ukraine, signing a two-year (1+1) deal.

National team career

Shved played with the Russian junior national teams. He played at the 2006 FIBA Europe Under-18 Championship, and at the 2007 and 2008 FIBA Europe Under-20 Championships. Shved has also been a member of the senior men's Russian national basketball team. He won the bronze medal at the EuroBasket 2011. At the 2012 Summer Olympics, on August 12, 2012, Shved scored 25 points, to lead the Russian national team to an 81–77 victory, over Argentina, in the bronze medal game.

He also played with Russia at the EuroBasket 2013, and at the EuroBasket 2017, where he led all scorers and was named in the All-Tournament Team.

Career statistics

NBA

Regular season

|-
| style="text-align:left;"| 
| style="text-align:left;"| Minnesota
| 77 || 16 || 23.9 || .372 || .295 || .720 || 2.3 || 3.7 || .7 || .4 || 8.6
|-
| style="text-align:left;"| 
| style="text-align:left;"| Minnesota
| 63 || 0 || 10.5 || .321 || .294 || .756 || 1.3 || 1.1 || .4 || .3 || 4.0
|-
| style="text-align:left;"| 
| style="text-align:left;"| Philadelphia
| 17 || 0 || 16.8 || .400 || .298 || .842 || 1.3 || 2.7 || .8 || .1 || 9.9
|-
| style="text-align: left;"| 
| style="text-align: left;"| Houston
| 9 || 0 || 6.6 || .333 || .333 || .818 || .4 || .3 || .1 || .0 || 3.2
|-
| style="text-align:left;"| 
| style="text-align:left;"| New York
| 16 || 9 || 26.4 || .403 || .371 || .780 || 4.6 || 3.6 || .9 || .3 || 14.8
|- class="sortbottom"
| align=center colspan="2"| Career
| 182 || 25 || 18 || .369 || .306 || .762 || 2.0 || 2.5 || .6 || .3 || 7.4
|-

EuroLeague

|-
| style="text-align:left;"| 2006–07
| style="text-align:left;" rowspan=6| CSKA Moscow
| 1 || 0 || 2.2 || .000 || .000 || .000 || .0 || .0 || .0 || .0 || .0 || .0
|-
| style="text-align:left;background:#AFE6BA;"| 2007–08†
| 8 || 0 || 4.1 || .538 || .500 || .667 || .3 || .0 || .1 || .1 || 2.8 || 2.1
|-
| style="text-align:left;"| 2008–09
| 3 || 0 || 3.2 || 1.000 || 1.000 || 1.000 || .3 || 1.0 || .3 || .0 || 2.3 || 5.0
|-
| style="text-align:left;"| 2009–10
| 2 || 0 || 1.9 || .000 || .000 || .500 || .5 || .5 || .0 || .0 || .5 || 1.0
|-
| style="text-align:left;"| 2010–11
| 7 || 1 || 12.3 || .550 || .444 || .500 || 1.4 || 1.1 || .3 || .1 || 4.4 || 4.6
|-
| style="text-align:left;"| 2011–12
| 21 || 3 || 21.6 || .487 || .493 || .833 || 2.6 || 3.0 || .6 || .2 || 10.6 || 11.0
|-
| style="text-align:left;"| 2015–16
| style="text-align:left;" rowspan=5| Khimki
| 24 || 18 || 26.6 || .409 || .348 || .737 || 2.8 || 4.0 || 1.3 || .3 || 15.9 || 14.5
|-
| style="text-align:left;"| 2017–18
| 34 || 34 || style="background:#cfecec;"|32.2 || .407 || .330 || .820 || 2.6 || 5.2 || 1.3 || .2 ||style="background:#cfecec;"| 21.8 || 20.4
|-
| style="text-align:left;"| 2018–19
| 14 || 14 || 32.0 || .392 || .365 || .806 || 2.8 || 6.6 || 1.6 || .3 || 23.3 || 23.2
|-
| style="text-align:left;"| 2019–20
| 26 || 26 || 31.2 || .390 || .329 || .892 || 2.7 || 6.2 || .9 || .4 || 21.4 || 19.4
|-
| style="text-align:left;"| 2020–21
| 23 || 22 || 32.2 || .455 || .333 || .899 || 3.7 || 7.7 || 1.3 || .4 || 19.8 || 19.6
|-
| style="text-align:left;"| 2021–22
| style="text-align:left;"| CSKA Moscow
| 21 || 20 || 25.2 || .500 || .369 || .848 || 2.4 || 3.3 || 1.0 || 0.3 || 11.6 || 10.3
|- class="sortbottom"
| align=center colspan="2"| Career
| 140 || 96 || 24.7 || .411 || .353 || .822 || 2.4 || 4.3 || 1.0 || .3 || 16.3 || 14.5

References

External links

 Alexey Shved at NBA.com
 Alexey Shved at eurobasket.com
 Alexey Shved at euroleague.net
 Alexey Shved at fiba.com (archive)
 Alexey Shved at fiba.com

1988 births
Living people
Basketball players at the 2012 Summer Olympics
BC Khimki players
BC Dynamo Moscow players
Houston Rockets players
Medalists at the 2012 Summer Olympics
Minnesota Timberwolves players
National Basketball Association players from Russia
New York Knicks players
Olympic basketball players of Russia
Olympic bronze medalists for Russia
Olympic medalists in basketball
PBC CSKA Moscow players
People from Belgorod
Philadelphia 76ers players
Point guards
Russian men's basketball players
Russian expatriate basketball people in the United States
Shooting guards
Undrafted National Basketball Association players
Sportspeople from Belgorod Oblast